Ade Samuel Hamnett (1882 – 1956) was an English footballer who played for Stoke.

Career
Hamnett was born in Chester and played for Birkenhead before joining Stoke in 1908. He played nine times for Stoke in 1908–09 before returning to amateur football with Annfield Plain and then Crewe All Saints.

Career statistics

References

English footballers
Stoke City F.C. players
Annfield Plain F.C. players
1882 births
1956 deaths
Association football midfielders